is the fourth studio album by the Japanese female idol group Shiritsu Ebisu Chugaku. The album was released on May 31, 2017, through SME Records.

The album is the groups' first release since the death of Rina Matsuno on February 8 due to a cardiac arrhythmia. It is also the last album to feature Aika Hirota, who would leave the group in January 2018.

Ebicracy is the only studio album by Ebichu that consists purely of newly written material, as the album contains no singles.

Background 
Although announced and released after Rina Matsuno's death, the album itself was already in the works prior to her passing. The track "Kanjou Densha" in particular, was demoed earlier than the other songs, due to it being used in a TV commercial. Since Ebichu's recording sessions involve all members singing every song as a solo track, and then piecing parts together, this resulted in "Kanjou Densha" having a "Rina Matsuno solo version". This recording was played during the end credits for the final show of the supporting tour, which was held on July 16 - Rina's birthday.  Other songs were modified following Rina's death, with "Nanairo" being completely re-ordered to fit the album.

The photo used for the album artwork, which features the seven members dressed in Taisho-era school uniforms, is actually a re-shoot, with the original being photographed while Rina was still alive.  A documentary, titled "Everything Point 5", focusing on the supporting tour and containing the final concert in full, was released on December 6, 2017.

Release 
The album was released in two versions: a regular edition and a two-CD limited edition. The limited edition's second disc contains seven of the albums tracks, each sung as a solo track by one of the members.  In addition, seven fan club exclusive versions were released. These are identical in content to the regular editions, the difference being that each version features a particular member on the cover art.

Track listing

CD

CD2 (Limited Edition only)

Personnel

Charts

Notes 

 All personnel and writing credits taken from the album insert.

References

External links 

 Ebicracy special website
 Discography on the Shiritsu Ebisu Chugaku official site

Shiritsu Ebisu Chugaku albums
2017 albums
SME Records albums